La Fosca is a neighbourhood of the town of Palamós and a beach on the Costa Brava, located in the comarca of Baix Empordà and the province of Girona in Catalonia, Spain. The town is by-passed by the C31 which connects the coastal towns of the central Costa Brava with Girona.

La Fosca is located at the northern end of a large bay, which is popular for swimming, sailing and windsurfing. Throughout most of the year very few people live there, but in summer the population of La Fosca grows quickly. La Fosca beach is known for the Roca Fosca, a large rock in the middle of the beach. Just to the east of the beach is the Castell de Sant Esteve de Mar, a ruined castle that predates the establishment of Palamós.

The GR 92 long distance footpath, which runs the length of the Mediterranean coast of Spain, crosses the beach at La Fosca. To the south the path follows the coast to the town of Palamós.

References

Populated places in Baix Empordà